Providence is a Charleroi Metro station, build on a viaduct and located in Marchienne-au-Pont (part of the Charleroi municipality), in fare zone 1. The station has only one entrance (on its western end), equipped with escalators and stairs.

About 300 m east of the station (toward Dampremy), as space was insufficient for 2 tram tracks because of the presence of industrial buildings, both tracks are merged into a single one for a couple of metres. At this point, speed is restricted to 25 km/h.

The name of the station comes from the now defunct Forges de la Providence steel factory which was located in front of where the station now is, and also gave its name to the adjacent street.

Nearby points of interest 
The station is located on the Sambre river bank, in a dense industrial area which explains the low passenger flow through the station.

Transfers  
TEC Charleroi bus lines 43, 50, 51, 52, 71, 72, 73, 74, 75, 83.

Charleroi Metro stations
Railway stations opened in 1992